Ansh Tandon (born 8 November 2001) is an Indian-born cricketer who plays for the United Arab Emirates national cricket team. In February 2020, he was named in the UAE's Twenty20 International (T20I) squad for the 2020 ACC Western Region T20 qualifier tournament. He made his T20I debut for the UAE, against Saudi Arabia, on 25 February 2020. Prior to his T20I debut, he was named in the United Arab Emirates squad for the 2020 Under-19 Cricket World Cup, and was named as one of the team's key players.

In January 2021, he was due to be selected in the UAE's One Day International (ODI) squad to play against Ireland. However, before the start of the tour he tested positive for COVID-19, and was ruled out of the series. In March 2021, he was called up by the Punjab Kings to train with the team ahead of the 2021 Indian Premier League.

References

External links
 

2001 births
Living people
Emirati cricketers
United Arab Emirates Twenty20 International cricketers
People from New Delhi
Cricketers from Delhi
Indian emigrants to the United Arab Emirates
Indian expatriate sportspeople in the United Arab Emirates